Malleostemon minilyaensis is a plant species of the family Myrtaceae endemic to Western Australia.

It blooms between August and October producing pink-white flowers.

It is found on sandplains or sand dunes in the Gascoyne region of Western Australia between Shark Bay and Carnarvon where it grows in sandy soils.

References

minilyaensis
Flora of Western Australia
Plants described in 1983